In motorsport, Group D is for international formula racing cars classified by the Fédération Internationale de l'Automobile in Appendix J of its International Sporting Code. The group was first described in Article 251 "Classification and Definitions", in 1982 along with the simultaneous introduction of Groups N, A, B, C and E.
Group D was placed in Category II for Competition Cars, cars that were single builds for racing purposes only. The Group continued to be defined in new publications of Appendix J Article 251, usually annually, until 2019.
Although Appendix J does define Formula 2 and Formula 3 as "international formulae", neither have ever been explicitly defined as being in or consisting of Group D in their respective technical or specific regulations. Further, Group D is not mentioned anywhere else in the International Sporting Code or its appendices other than the initial classification and definition in Article 251.

See also
Formula Two
Formula Three
Formula 3000
Group N
Group A
Group B
Group C
Group E

References

External Links

 Period Appendix J at the FIA Historic Database

Fédération Internationale de l'Automobile
Sports car racing
Open wheel racing